Cherkaske is the name of two urban localities in Ukraine.

Cherkaske, an urban-type settlement in Novomoskovsk Raion, Dnipropetrovsk Oblast
Cherkaske, an urban-type settlement in Sloviansk Raion, Donetsk Oblast

See also
 Cherkasskoye